Dennis Gastmann (born 11 June 1978) is a former German reporter and television presenter. He became famous for the German award winning TV series Mit 80,000 Fragen um die Welt.

Biography
Gastmann was born in Osnabrück, Germany and began writing at age seven. After winning a writing contest and working for the local newspaper, he studied journalism and political science at the University of Hamburg. At 24 he joined the TV-magazine Extra3, shown on North German Broadcasting. After four years, he became so called "world reporter" of the political TV-magazine Weltbilder (Pictures of the World), starting his prize-winning series "Mit 80.000 Fragen um die Welt" (With 80,000 Questions Around the World). In 2011, he walked from Hamburg to Canossa, Italy, following in the historical footsteps of Emperor Henry IV.

Gastmann lives in Hamburg, Germany.

References

External links
 

University of Hamburg
German journalists
German male journalists
German television presenters
Living people
People from Osnabrück
1978 births
German male writers